The Ceroxyloideae are a subfamily of flowering plants in the palm family found mainly in the Americas with an outlying genus in each of Australia, Madagascar, and the Comoros.  Recently revised, the former subfamily Phytelephantoideae was reduced to the tribal level and included, while the Hyophorbeae tribe was reassigned to Arecoideae; it now contains eight genera.

Description
From small to moderate to the tallest in the family, the trunks may be solitary or clustering and lack armament. The reduplicate leaf is regularly or irregularly pinnate, bifid, or entire with pinnate ribs; crownshafts are present in some members and absent in others.  Monoecious, dioecious, and hermaphroditic palms occur in the group; a protective prophyll accompanies the inflorescence, and all feature peduncular bracts. Any unisexual flowers are slightly dimorphic, solitary, or in rows; all have syncarpous, triovulate gynoecium.

Tribes

Ceroxyleae
Four widely spread genera occur in South America, Australia, and Madagascar, characterized by tall, rarely slender, trunks which lack crownshafts. The flowers are early-opening, solitary, spirally or subdistichously arranged, with small bracts.

Cyclospatheae
A monotypic tribe from North and Central America, they have moderately sized, erect trunks, with crownshafts. The flowers are solitary, spirally arranged, hermaphroditic, and borne in the axils of small bracts.

Phytelepheae
Three dioecious South American palms, with moderate to large, acaulescent or erect trunks, their staminate inflorescences are spike-like, while the pistillate are branched and spreading. The fruit is usually borne in dense clusters, each containing five to 10 seeds.

References

External links
 Ceroxyloideae on NPGS/GRIN

 
Commelinid subfamilies
Taxa named by Carl Georg Oscar Drude